The 2017–18 North West Counties Football League season (known as the Hallmark Security League for sponsorship reasons) was the 36th in the history of the North West Counties Football League, a football competition in England. It was also the last season to have a single Division One. Teams were divided into two divisions: Premier Division and Division One.

The constitution for Step 5 and Step 6 divisions for 2017–18 was announced by the FA on 26 May 2017, and ratified by the league at its AGM on 17 June.

Premier Division

At the end of season 2016–17, the following four teams left the division:
 Atherton Collieries, promoted to NPL Division One North
 Cammell Laird 1907, relegated to Division One
 Nelson, relegated to Division One
 New Mills, relegated to Division One

The remaining 18 teams, together with the following, formed the Premier Division for season 2017–18:
 Burscough, relegated from NPL Division One North
 Charnock Richard, promoted from the First Division
 City of Liverpool, promoted from the First Division
 Northwich Victoria, relegated from NPL Division One South
 Widnes, promoted from the First Division

League table

Results

Stadia and locations

 Due to ground conditions and acute fixture congestion, 1874 Northwich played some home matches, notably in the latter stages of the FA Vase and the league programme, at Wincham Park, Northwich, home of Witton Albion.

Division One

At the end of season 2016–17, the following four teams left the division:
 Ashton Town, relegated to the Cheshire Association Football League Premier Division.
 Charnock Richard, promoted to the Premier Division
 City of Liverpool, promoted to the Premier Division
 Widnes, promoted to the Premier Division
The remaining 18 teams, together with the following, formed Division One for the 2017–18 season:
 Abbey Hulton United, promoted from Staffordshire County Senior League
 Cammell Laird 1907, relegated from the Premier Division
 Nelson, relegated from the Premier Division
 New Mills, relegated from the Premier Division

League table

Results

 Bacup Borough v FC Oswestry Town: visitors failed to fulfil fixture on 5 May, result declared a 3–0 home win
 St Helens Town v Abbey Hulton United: result declared a draw following investigation

Playoffs
Source for this subsection: NWC website

Stadia and locations

League Challenge Cup
Also called the Macron Challenge Cup for sponsorship reasons.
Source for this section: NWCFL web site

First round

Northern Section

Southern Section

All remaining teams received byes to the second round.

Second round

Northern Section

* Played at Padiham, following two postponements
** Played at Ashton, following two postponements
*** Played at Crosby, following two postponements
**** Played at Prestwich, following two postponements
† Padiham and Nelson eliminated, having fielded ineligible players

Southern Section

* Played at Abbey Hulton, following two postponements
** Played at Birkenhead, following two postponements

Third round

Northern Section

Southern Section

Quarter-finals

Semi-finals

First Leg

Second Leg

Final
Played at Highbury Stadium, home of Fleetwood Town.

Division One Trophy
Also called the LWC Drinks First Division Cup for sponsorship reasons.
Source for this section: NWCFL web site

First round

Northern Section

* Played at Carlisle following two postponements

Southern Section

All the remaining First Division teams received a bye to the second round.

Second round

Northern Section

Southern Section

Quarter-finals

Northern Section

* Atherton LR disqualified for fielding an ineligible player

Southern Section

Semi-finals

First leg

Second leg

Final
Played at the Millbank Linnets Stadium, home of Runcorn Linnets.

References

External links 
 nwcfl.com (The Official Website of The North West Counties Football League)

North West Counties Football League seasons
9